The 2018 Archery World Cup, also known as the Hyundai Archery World Cup for sponsorship reasons, was the 13th edition of the international archery circuit organised annually by World Archery. The 2018 World Cup consisted of five events, and ran from 23 April to 30 September 2018.

Calendar
The calendar for the 2018 World Cup, announced by World Archery.

Results

Recurve

Men's individual

Women's individual

Men's team

Women's team

Mixed team

Compound

Men's individual

Women's individual

Men's team

Women's team

Mixed team

Medals table

References

External links
 World Archery website

Archery World Cup
World Cup
International archery competitions hosted by China
2018 in Chinese sport
International archery competitions hosted by Turkey
2018 in Turkish sport
International archery competitions hosted by the United States
2018 in American sports
International archery competitions hosted by Germany
2018 in German sport
April 2018 sports events in China
May 2018 sports events in Turkey
May 2018 sports events in the United States
July 2018 sports events in Germany
September 2018 sports events in Turkey